The 1978 Iowa gubernatorial election was held on November 7, 1978. Incumbent Republican Robert D. Ray defeated Democratic nominee Jerome D. Fitzgerald with 58.32% of the vote. , this was the last time Johnson County voted for the Republican candidate.

Primary elections
Primary elections were held on June 6, 1978.

Democratic primary

Candidates
Jerome D. Fitzgerald, State Representative
Tom Whitney
Warren D. Strait

Results

Republican primary

Candidates
Robert D. Ray, incumbent Governor
Donovan D. Nelson

Results

General election

Candidates
Major party candidates
Robert D. Ray, Republican
Jerome D. Fitzgerald, Democratic 

Other candidates
John Ball, Libertarian
Joseph Grant, Socialist

Results

References

1978
Iowa
Gubernatorial